Julius Jackson (born August 1, 1987) is a professional boxer from the Virgin Islands who qualified for the 2008 Olympics at light-heavyweight, as did his brother John Jackson. Their father is boxer Julian Jackson.

Amateur
At the 2007 World Championships he lost to Ireland's Kenneth Egan by RSCO. At the first Olympic qualifier he lost 3:10 to Julio Castillo.

At the second qualifier he benefited from a bye and defeated boxers from Nicaragua and Mexico to qualify. His loss to Eleider Alvarez did not have an effect on his qualification. At the Olympics he lost in the round of 32 to Kenneth Egan again, by 22-2.

Pro
Julius Jackson is currently professionally fighting with a record of 20-2 (16 KOs). He previously held the WBC USNBC Title and the WBA Fedebol Title.

Acting
Julius Jackson has acted in the role of a boxer in the Telemundo series El César on the life of Julio César Chávez.

References

External links
 
 1st qualifier
 2nd qualifier

1987 births
Living people
People from Saint Thomas, U.S. Virgin Islands
United States Virgin Islands male boxers
Light-heavyweight boxers
Boxers at the 2008 Summer Olympics
Olympic boxers of the United States Virgin Islands
American male boxers